A public execution is a form of capital punishment which "members of the general public may voluntarily attend." This definition excludes the presence of only a small number of witnesses called upon to assure executive accountability. The purpose of such displays has historically been to deter individuals from defying laws or authorities. Attendance at such events was historically encouraged and sometimes even mandatory.

While today most countries regard public executions with distaste, they have been practiced at some point in history nearly everywhere. At many points in the past, public executions were preferred to executions behind closed doors because of their capacity for deterrence. However, the actual efficacy of this form of terror is disputed. They also allowed the convicted the opportunity to make a final speech, gave the state the chance to display its power in front of those who fell under its jurisdiction, and granted the public what was considered to be a great spectacle. Public executions also permitted the state to project its superiority over political opponents.

History

The ancient world 
People were crucified in ancient Macedonia, Persia, Jerusalem, Phoenicia, Rome, and Carthage.

China 
Public executions were common in China from at least the Tang Dynasty.

In modern China, hundreds of thousands of people were executed during the Cultural Revolution.

Medieval Islam 
There are reports of public executions in early Islam, especially for sodomy.

Medieval Europe 
Documented public executions date back to at least the late medieval period, and peaked in the later sixteenth century. This peak was due in part to the witch trials of the early modern period. In the late Middle Ages, executions used increasingly brutal methods designed to inflict pain on the victim while still alive and to generate a spectacle in order to deter others from committing crimes.The cruelty of the mode of execution (including the amount victims were tortured before the actual execution) was also more or less extreme depending on the crime itself. Punishments often invoked the "purifying" powers of earth (burial), water (drowning), and fire (burning alive). Victims were also decapitated, quartered, hanged, and beaten. Bodies or body parts were often displayed in public places and authorities took pains to ensure that remains would stay visible for as long as possible.

However, the death penalty was not used in all parts of Europe. Vladimir the Great abolished the death penalty in Kievan Rus' following his conversion to Christianity in 988.

Modern Europe 
During the seventeenth century, premortem torture was used increasingly less, and instead bodies were desecrated after death and for display purposes. By the beginning of the eighteenth century, the number of capital punishments in Western Europe had fallen by about 85% from the previous century as the legal system shifted toward one that considered human rights as well as a more rational approach to criminal justice that centered around identifying the best methods for deterrence. However, there were several resurgences throughout the eighteenth and nineteenth centuries, especially during times of social unrest. Executions were condemned by eighteenth-century Enlightenment thinkers like Jeremy Bentham and Cesare Beccaria. Enlightenment thinkers were not universally opposed to public executions, however—many anatomists found executions useful because they supplied healthy body parts to study and experiment on. People also found postmortem torture (which was typically part of a public execution) disrespectful to the dead and believed that it could prevent the victim from getting into heaven.

The first modern abolition of capital punishment was in Tuscany in 1786.

In Europe, the 19th and early 20th centuries saw a shift away from the spectacle of public capital punishment and toward private executions and the deprivation of liberty (e.g. incarceration, probation, community service, etc). This coincided with a general tendency to shield all death from public view.

In Great Britain, 1801 saw the last public execution at Tyburn Hill, after which all executions in York took place within the walls of York Castle (but still publicly) so that "the entrance to the town should not be annoyed by dragging criminals through the streets." In London, those sentenced to death at the Old Bailey would remain at Newgate Prison and wait for their sentences to be carried out in the street. As at Tyburn, the crowds who would come to watch continued to be large and unruly. The last public execution in Great Britain occurred in 1868, after which capital punishment was carried out in the privacy of prisons.

In France, authorities continued public executions up until 1939. Executions were made private after a secret film of serial killer Eugen Weidmann's death by guillotine emerged and scandalized the process. Disturbing reports emerged of spectators soaking up Weidmann's blood in rags for souvenirs, and in response President Albert Lebrun banned public executions in France for "promoting baser instincts of human nature."

Nazi Germany utilized public execution by hanging, shooting, and decapitation.

Judicial executions also occurred in Soviet Russia.

Colonial world 
Public executions as a cultural practice, having been common in Western Europe, were brought to colonies in the Americas, Africa, and Asia.

Venezuela abolished the death penalty entirely in 1863.

United States 
The last public execution in the United States occurred in 1936. As in Europe, the practice of execution was moved to the privacy of chambers. Viewing remains available for those related to the person being executed, victims' families, and sometimes reporters.

Frances Larson wrote in her 2014 book Severed: A History of Heads Lost and Heads Found:"For as long as there were public executions, there were crowds to see them. In London in the early 19th century, there might have been 5,000 to watch a standard hanging, but crowds of up to 100,000 came to see a famous felon killed. The numbers hardly changed over the years. An estimated 20,000 watched Rainey Bethea hang in 1936, in what turned out to be the last public execution in the U.S."

Modern day 

Most countries have abolished the death penalty entirely, either in law or in practice.

According to Amnesty International, in 2012 "public executions were known to have been carried out in Iran, North Korea, Saudi Arabia and Somalia." Amnesty International does not include Syria, Afghanistan, and Yemen in their list of public execution countries, but there have been reports of public executions carried out there by state and non-state actors, such as ISIL. 
Kuwait has sometimes executed people in public. The prisoners are taken to the gallows and once a senior police officer gives the signed, the prisoners are hanged.

In the US, members of the public can visit the jail where an execution is about to take place.

See also
 Public executions in Iran
 Public executions in North Korea

References

Capital punishment